Prikeba ("Keba") Reed Phipps (born June 30, 1969) is a volleyball player from the United States, who represented her native country at the 2004 Summer Olympics in Athens, Greece. There she finished in fifth place with the USA National Team. Phipps also competed at the 1988 Summer Olympics where she was the youngest player on the roster, at 19 years old.

Clubs

International Competitions
1987 – NORCECA Continental Championships (silver medal)
1987 – Pan American Games (bronze medal)
1988 – Olympic Games (seventh place)
1989 – NORCECA Continental Championships (bronze medal)
2002 – World Championships (silver medal)
2003 – FIVB World Grand Prix (bronze medal)
2003 – World Cup (bronze medal)
2003 – NORCECA Zone Championships (gold medal)
2004 – FIVB World Grand Prix (bronze medal)
2004 – Olympic Games (fifth place)

References
 Profile

External links
 

1969 births
Living people
American women's volleyball players
Volleyball players at the 1988 Summer Olympics
Volleyball players at the 2004 Summer Olympics
Olympic volleyball players of the United States
People from Lakewood, California
Place of birth missing (living people)
Outside hitters
Expatriate volleyball players in Italy
African-American volleyball players
21st-century African-American people
21st-century African-American women
20th-century African-American sportspeople
20th-century African-American women
Pan American Games medalists in volleyball
Pan American Games bronze medalists for the United States
Medalists at the 1987 Pan American Games